Henry Joseph Woodroffe  was an Anglican priest in Ireland in the second half of the 19th century.

Woodroffe was educated at Trinity College, Dublin. and ordained in 1870. After curacies in Boyle, Carrigaline and Queenstown (now called Cobh), he wheld incumbencies at Ballynoe, Aghern and Lislee. He was Archdeacon of Ross from 1883 to 1889.

Notes

Alumni of Trinity College Dublin
19th-century Irish Anglican priests
Archdeacons of Ross, Ireland